The Match is a 2019 Italian drama film directed and written by Francesco Carnesecchi and starring Francesco Pannofino, Alberto Di Stasio and Giorgio Colangeli.

Cast 
 Francesco Pannofino as Claudio Bulla
 Alberto Di Stasio as Italo
 Giorgio Colangeli as Umberto
 Gabriele Fiore as Antonio
 Daniele Mariani as Leo
 Lidia Vitale as Roberta
 Fabrizio Sabatucci as Paolo
 Veruska Rossi as Gianna
 Simone Liberati as Ragazzo in macchina
 Giulia Schiavo as Ragazza in macchina
 Giada Fradeani as Laura
 Efisio Sanna as Ettore
 Stefano Ambrogi as Cristian
 Francesca Antonelli as Tifosa
 Giulia Cragnotti as Giulietta

References

External links 
 
 

2019 drama films
2019 films
Italian drama films
2010s Italian-language films
Italian-language Netflix original films